Scirpophaga innotata, the rice white stemborer, is a species of moth of the family Crambidae. The species was described by Francis Walker in 1863. It is found in Indonesia, Pakistan, the Philippines and the tropical north of Australia.

The larvae are considered a pest on Oryza sativa (Asian rice).

External links
 Australian Caterpillars

Schoenobiinae
Moths of Asia
Moths of Australia
Moths described in 1863